"Blue Rose Is" is a song co-written and recorded by American country music artist Pam Tillis. It was released in April 1992 as the fifth single from the 1991 album Put Yourself in My Place. The song reached No. 21 on the Billboard Hot Country Singles & Tracks chart. The song was written by Tillis, Bob DiPiero and Jan Buckingham.

Chart performance

References

1991 songs
1992 singles
Pam Tillis songs
Songs written by Bob DiPiero
Songs written by Pam Tillis
Song recordings produced by Paul Worley
Arista Records singles